The landmarks on U.S. Route 66 include roadside attractions, notable establishments, and buildings of historical significance along U.S. Route 66 (US 66, Route 66).

The increase of tourist traffic to California in the 1950s prompted the creation of motels and roadside attractions as an attempt of businesses along the route to get the attention of motorists passing by. With the decommissioning of Route 66 many of these sites fell into disrepair, but some still exist and have been the focus of preservation efforts.

Illinois 

 Lou Mitchell's (Chicago) – A restaurant listed on the National Register of Historic Places, and nicknamed "the first stop on the Mother Road".
 Gemini Giant (Wilmington) – A 30-ft tall Muffler Man fiberglass statue of a spaceman with a rocket.
 Cozy Dog Drive In (Springfield) – A hot dog restaurant with Route 66 memorabilia and a gift shop.
 Maid-Rite Sandwich Shop (Springfield) – Maid-Rite franchise built in 1921 and housed in a listed building.
 Shea's Gas Station Museum (Springfield) – Former gas station and museum currently in use as a restaurant. 
 Dixie Travel Plaza (McLean) –  Large trucker and travel plaza.

Missouri 

 World's second largest rocking chair, Fanning – Large statue of a rocking chair.
 Red's Giant Hamburg (Springfield) – The world's first drive-through restaurant.
 66 Drive-In (Carthage) – Historic drive-in theater.
 Ted Drewes (St. Louis) – A frozen custard company.

Kansas 

 Baxter Springs Independent Oil and Gas Service Station (Baxter Springs) – Historic gas station.
 Rainbow Bridge (Riverton) – Historic bridge.
 Williams' Store (Riverton) – Historic store.
 Kan-O-Tex Service Station (Galena) – Former service station and souvenir shop.

Oklahoma 

 Blue whale of Catoosa (Catoosa) – A waterfront structure in the shape of a blue whale. 
 Pops restaurant (Arcadia) – A soda pop themed restaurant with a neon sign in the shape of a soda pop bottle.
 Round barn (Arcadia) – A round barn built in 1898.
 Milk Bottle Grocery (Oklahoma City) – Historic grocery store with a large metal Braum's milk bottle atop its roof.
 Rock Café (Stroud) – Restored historic restaurant. Owner Dawn Welch inspired the character of Sally Carrera in the movie Cars.
 Foyil Filling Station (Foyil) – Historic filling station.

Texas 

 Leaning tower of Britten (Groom) –  A leaning water tower.
 Cadillac ranch (Amarillo) – Public art installation created in 1974 by Chip Lord, Hudson Marquez and Doug Michels.
 The Big Texan Steak Ranch (Amarillo) – A steakhouse restaurant best known for its 72-ounce (4.5 pounds or 2.04 kg) steak challenge.
 U-Drop Inn (Shamrock) – A listed art deco gas station and restaurant, used as inspiration for one of the buildings in the cartoon village of Radiator Springs, in the movie Cars.

New Mexico 

 Blue swallow motel (Tucumcari) – Motel listed on the National Register of Historic Places in New Mexico.
 El Rancho Hotel & Motel (Gallup) – Historic hotel used as a base for several movie productions in the 40s, 50s and early 60s.
 Aztec Motel (Albuquerque) – Historic motel demolished in 2011.
 Maisel's Indian Trading Post (Albuquerque) – Native crafts store opened in 1939 in a Pueblo Revival building featuring murals designed by Olive Rush.

Arizona 

 Wigwam Motel (Holbrook) – A motel with rooms built in the form of tipis.
 Standin' on the Corner Park (Winslow) – A public park commemorating the song "Take It Easy", recorded by the Eagles.
 Jack Rabbit Trading Post (Joseph City) – Convenience store and curio shop featuring a large fiberglass jackrabbit.
 Delgadillo's Snow Cap Drive-In (Seligman) – Restaurant built in 1953 by Juan Delgadillo, brother of Angel Delgadillo, the "guardian angel" of U.S. Route 66.
 Meteor City, Arizona (Coconino County) – Historic trading post.
 Valentine Diner (Valentine) – Prefabricated diner.

California 

 Elmer's Bottle Tree Ranch (Oro Grande, California) – Unique pitstop featuring many tree-shaped sculptures made from glass bottles & vintage items.
 Wigwam Village #7 (San Bernardino) – Another location of the Wigwam Motel chain.
 Bagdad Cafe (Newberry Springs) – Formerly the Sidewinder Cafe, renamed for the Bagdad Cafe movie, which was filmed there.
 66 Motel (Needles) – Former motel.
 Cucamonga Service Station (Rancho Cucamonga, California) – Restored service station built in 1915 & now housing a museum of Route 66 & the local area.
 Bono's Historic Orange (Fontana, California) – one of the last extant giant orange-shaped fruit stands once common to the region. This stand was built in 1936 and moved to its present location in 1997.
 Old Trails Bridge (Needles) – Bridge over the Colorado river.
 Aztec Hotel (Monrovia, California) – A 44-room hotel opened in 1925 (one year before the creation of Route 66) and built in "Mayan style" though it was named "Aztec" because its designer, architect Robert B. Stacy believed that the general public was more familiar with the Aztecs than the Mayans.
 Chicken Boy (Los Angeles) – A Muffler Man statue with a chicken head. 
 Roy's Motel and Café (Amboy) – A restored service station with Googie architecture features.
 Summit Inn –  Historic roadside diner located at the summit of el Cajon Pass in San Bernardino County, California.
 Barstow Harvey House (Barstow) – Historic building, formerly a hotel and railroad depot.

See also
 List of Route 66 museums
 Novelty architecture

References

External links
 Roadside America: The Decline Of Kitsch? by NPR
 Society for Commercial Archeology

Roadside attractions
Tourist attractions along U.S. Route 66
Landmarks